Johnathan Wong (born 23 August 1992) is a Malaysian sport shooter. He competed in the men's 10 metre air pistol event at the 2016 Summer Olympics. He also competed at the 2017 Southeast Asian Games which he won gold in the 10 metre air pistol event and silver in the 50 metre pistol event. He also studies Aerospace engineering at Universiti Putra Malaysia.

References

External links
 

1992 births
Living people
Malaysian male sport shooters
University of Putra Malaysia alumni
Olympic shooters of Malaysia
Shooters at the 2016 Summer Olympics
Place of birth missing (living people)
Southeast Asian Games gold medalists for Malaysia
Southeast Asian Games silver medalists for Malaysia
Southeast Asian Games medalists in shooting
Shooters at the 2014 Asian Games
Shooters at the 2018 Asian Games
Competitors at the 2017 Southeast Asian Games
Asian Games competitors for Malaysia